Ollans is a commune in the Doubs department in the Bourgogne-Franche-Comté region in eastern France.

Geography
It is situated on the Ognon, which forms the border between the two departments.

Population

See also
 Communes of the Doubs department

References

External links

 Ollans on the intercommunal Web site of the department 

Communes of Doubs